Roger Gantz was a U.S. soccer midfielder who played one season in the Western Soccer Alliance and three in the Continental Indoor Soccer League.

Gantz grew up in Portland, Oregon where he was a standout soccer player at the Catlin Gabel School.  While still in high school, he spent one season playing as an amateur with the semi-professional F.C. Portland of the Western Soccer Alliance.  After graduating from Catlin in 1989, he entered the University of Portland.  He played four seasons, 1989 to 1993, with the Pilots.  In 1993, he spent the collegiate off season with the expansion Portland Pride of the Continental Indoor Soccer League.  He would spend five seasons with the Pride.  In the spring of 2001, he tried out with the expansion Portland Timbers of the USL First Division, but was released on May 25, 2001. Gantz currently lives in Hamilton, Montana, where he works in Real Estate.

References

Living people
Soccer players from Portland, Oregon
Portland Pilots men's soccer players
Western Soccer Alliance players
Portland Timbers (1985–1990) players
Continental Indoor Soccer League players
Portland Pride players
Year of birth missing (living people)
Portland Timbers (2001–2010) players
Catlin Gabel School alumni
Association football midfielders
American soccer players